Double Violin Concerto may refer to: 
Concerto for Two Violins and String Orchestra, Op. 77 by Malcolm Arnold
Concerto for Two Violins in D minor, BWV 1043 by Johann Sebastian Bach
 Double Concerto for Two Violins and Orchestra, Op. 49 by Gustav Holst
 Concerto for Two Violins and Orchestra by Karl Marx